Burns is an unincorporated community in Bowie County, in the U.S. state of Texas. According to the Handbook of Texas, the community had a population of 400 in 2000. It is located within the Texarkana metropolitan area.

History
Burns was most likely named for a family surnamed Burns and had a population of 400 in 2000.

Geography

Education
Burns had a school for black children at one point. Today, the community is served by the Hooks Independent School District.

References

Unincorporated communities in Bowie County, Texas
Unincorporated communities in Texas